The 2009 Cleveland Indians season marks the 109th season for the franchise, with the Indians attempting (but failing) to improve on their 81-81 record and third-place finish in the AL Central in 2008. The team played all of its home games at Progressive Field (formerly known as Jacobs Field).

The season began on April 6 with a 9–1 loss to the Texas Rangers at Rangers Ballpark in Arlington. The Home Opener was on April 10 with the Indians losing 13–7 to the Toronto Blue Jays. The season ended on October 4 against the rival Boston Red Sox at Fenway Park.

2009 is the first year that the Indians held spring training in Goodyear, Arizona. Goodyear replaces Winter Haven, Florida after 15 years of spring training.

The Indians ended their season at 65-97. For the Indians, this marks their first season since 1987 (the infamous "Indian Uprising" season) that they were below .500 for the entire season.

Regular season

April 
The Indians struggled at the beginning of the season, losing their first five and seven of their first eight games. They finished with an 8-14 record in April, and were in last place in the AL central for the entire month. One of the few highlights of the month was the Tribe defeating former Indian CC Sabathia and the New York Yankees 10-2 in the first game ever at the new Yankee Stadium. Starting pitcher Cliff Lee had his first win of the season in that game. Two days later, the Indians defeated the Yankees 22-4.

May 
The Indians went 14-16 in May, but were in last place in the division throughout the entire month. The Indians struggled on many fronts, including an ineffective bullpen and poor hitting. Several players were sent to the disabled list including Travis Hafner, Grady Sizemore, and Asdrúbal Cabrera. The poor play and injuries allowed many minor league players to come up from AAA Columbus and contribute to the Indians. A turning point came in the season when on May 25, when the Indians defeated the Tampa Bay Rays 11-10 after coming back from a 10-0 deficit. The Indians rallied to win 5 of the final 7 games in the month

Season standings

Record vs. opponents

Roster

Game log 

|- bgcolor="ffbbbb"
|- align="center" bgcolor="ffbbbb"
| 1 || April 6 || @ Rangers || 9–1 || Millwood (1–0) || Lee (0–1) || || 49,916 || 0–1
|- align="center" bgcolor="ffbbbb"
| 2 || April 8 || @ Rangers || 8–5 || Padilla (1–0) || Carmona (0–1) || Francisco (1) || 22,829 || 0–2
|- align="center" bgcolor="ffbbbb"
| 3 || April 9 || @ Rangers || 12–8 || McCarthy (1–0) || Pavano (0–1) || || 14,672 || 0–3
|- align="center" bgcolor="ffbbbb"
| 4 || April 10 || Blue Jays || 13–7 || League (1–0) || Pérez (0–1) || || 42,473 || 0–4
|- align="center" bgcolor="ffbbbb"
| 5 || April 11 || Blue Jays || 5–4 || Halladay (2–0) || Lee (0–2) || Frasor (1) || 20,895 || 0–5
|- align="center" bgcolor="bbffbb"
| 6 || April 12 || Blue Jays || 8–4 || Reyes (1–0) || Purcey (0–1) || || 14,216 || 1–5
|- align="center" bgcolor="ffbbbb"
| 7 || April 13 || @ Royals || 4–2 || Greinke (2–0) || Carmona (0–2) || Soria (4) || 10,061 || 1–6
|- align="center" bgcolor="ffbbbb"
| 8 || April 14 || @ Royals || 9–3 || Davies (1–0) || Pavano (0–2) || || 11,756 || 1–7
|- align="center" bgcolor="bbffbb"
| 9 || April 15 || @ Royals || 5–4 || Lewis (1–0) || Farnsworth (0–2) || Wood (1) || 13,589 || 2–7
|- align="center" bgcolor="bbffbb"
| 10 || April 16 || @ Yankees || 10–2 || Lee (1–2) || Veras (0–1) || || 48,271 || 3–7
|- align="center" bgcolor="ffbbbb"
| 11 || April 17 || @ Yankees || 6–5 || Bruney (2–0) || Lewis (1–1) || Rivera (3) || 45,101 || 3–8
|- align="center" bgcolor="bbffbb"
| 12 || April 18 || @ Yankees || 22–4 || Carmona (1–2) || Wang (0–3) || || 45,167 || 4–8
|- align="center" bgcolor="ffbbbb"
| 13 || April 19 || @ Yankees || 7–3 || Albaladejo (1–0) || Lewis (1–2) || || 43,068 || 4–9
|- align="center" bgcolor="bbffbb"
| 14 || April 21 || Royals || 8–7 || Laffey (1–0) || Ponson (0–2) || Wood (2) || 11,408 || 5–9
|- align="center" bgcolor="ffbbbb"
| 15 || April 22 || Royals || 2–0 || Bannister (1–0) || Lee (1–3) || Soria (5) || 13,509 || 5–10
|- align="center" bgcolor="bbffbb"
| 16 || April 23 || Royals || 5–2 || Lewis (2–2) || Meche (1–1) || Wood (3) || 12,852 || 6–10
|- align="center" bgcolor="ffbbbb"
| 17 || April 24 || Twins || 5–1 || Blackburn (1–1) || Carmona (1–3) || || 20,215 || 6–11
|- align="center" bgcolor="ffbbbb"
| 18 || April 25 || Twins || 7–1 || Slowey (3–0) || Pavano (0–3) || || 23,186 || 6–12
|- align="center" bgcolor="bbffbb"
| 19 || April 26 || Twins || 4–2 || Laffey (2–0) || Perkins (1–2) || Wood (4) || 20,153 || 7–12
|- align="center" bgcolor="ffbbbb"
| 20 || April 27 || Red Sox || 3–1 || Delcarmen (1–0) || Wood (0–1) || Papelbon (5) || 18,652 || 7–13
|- align="center" bgcolor="bbffbb"
| 21 || April 28 || Red Sox || 9–8 || Wood (1–1) || López (0–2) || || 19,613 || 8–13
|- align="center" bgcolor="ffbbbb"
| 22 || April 29 || Red Sox || 6 – 5 (10) || Okajima (2–0) || Lewis (2–3) || Papelbon (6) || 19,137 || 8–14
|-

|- bgcolor="ffbbbb"
|- align="center" bgcolor="bbffbb"
| 23 || May 1 || @ Tigers || 6–5 || Pavano (1–3) || Galarraga (3–1) || Wood (5) || 22,288 || 9–14
|- align="center" bgcolor="ffbbbb"
| 24 || May 2 || @ Tigers || 9–7 || Zumaya (1–0) || Betancourt (0–1) || Rodney (5) || 34,646 || 9–15
|- align="center" bgcolor="ffbbbb"
| 25 || May 3 || @ Tigers || 3–1 || Verlander (2–2) || Lee (1–4) || Rodney (6) || 27,411 || 9–16
|- align="center" bgcolor="bbffbb"
| 26 || May 4 || @ Blue Jays || 9 – 7 (12) || Betancourt (1–1) || Camp (0–1) || Lewis (1) || 15,295 || 10–16
|- align="center" bgcolor="ffbbbb"
| 27 || May 5 || @ Blue Jays || 10–6 || Wolfe (1–0) || Chulk (0–1) || || 22,005 || 10–17
|- align="center" bgcolor="bbffbb"
| 28 || May 6 || @ Red Sox || 9–2 || Pavano (2–3) || Masterson (2–2) || Laffey (1) || 37,888 || 11–17
|- align="center" bgcolor="ffbbbb"
| 29 || May 7 || @ Red Sox || 13–3 || Wakefield (4–1) || Sowers (0–1) || || 37,541 || 11–18
|- align="center" bgcolor="ffbbbb"
| 30 || May 8 || Tigers || 1–0 || Verlander (3–2) || Lee (1–5) || || 27,492 || 11–19
|- align="center" bgcolor="ffbbbb"
| 31 || May 9 || Tigers || 4–0 || Jackson (2–2) || Carmona (1–4) || || 33,640 || 11–20
|- align="center" bgcolor="ffbbbb"
| 32 || May 10 || Tigers || 5–3 || Porcello (3–3) || Reyes (1–1) || || 25,705 || 11–21
|- align="center" bgcolor="bbffbb"
| 33 || May 11 || White Sox || 9–4 || Pavano (3–3) || Floyd (2–3) || || 14,567 || 12–21
|- align="center" bgcolor="ffbbbb"
| 34 || May 12 || White Sox || 7–4 || Carrasco (1–0) || Sowers (0–2) || Jenks (8) || 16,760 || 12–22
|- align="center" bgcolor="bbffbb"
| 35 || May 13 || White Sox || 4–0 || Lee (2–5) || Buehrle (5–1) || || 23,884 || 13–22
|- align="center" bgcolor="bbffbb"
| 36 || May 14 || @ Rays || 11–7 || Carmona (2–4) || Shields (3–4) || || 17,169 || 14–22
|- align="center" bgcolor="ffbbbb"
| 37 || May 15 || @ Rays || 8–7 || Wheeler (1–0) || Vizcaíno (0–1) || || 25,827 || 14–23
|- align="center" bgcolor="ffbbbb"
| 38 || May 16 || @ Rays || 4–2 || Garza (4–2) || Pavano (3–4) || Nelson (2) || 34,235 || 14–24
|- align="center" bgcolor="ffbbbb"
| 39 || May 17 || @ Rays || 7–5 || Sonnanstine (2–4) || Huff (0–1) || Percival (6) || 28,841 || 14–25
|- align="center" bgcolor="ffbbbb"
| 40 || May 19 || @ Royals || 6–5 || Farnsworth (1–3) || Wood (1–2) || || 25,024 || 14–26
|- align="center" bgcolor="bbffbb"
| 41 || May 20 || @ Royals || 6–5 || Laffey (3–0) || Ponson (1–5) || Wood (6) || 19,652 || 15–26
|- align="center" bgcolor="bbffbb"
| 42 || May 21 || @ Royals || 8–3 || Pavano (4–4) || Ramírez (0–2) || Betancourt (1) || 23,095 || 16–26
|- align="center" bgcolor="ffbbbb"
| 43 || May 22 || @ Reds || 3–1 || Arroyo (6–3) || Laffey (3–1) || Cordero (11) || 28,019 || 16–27
|- align="center" bgcolor="bbffbb"
| 44 || May 23 || @ Reds || 7–6 || Vizcaíno (1–1) || Weathers (0–1) || Wood (7) || 35,821 || 17–27
|- align="center" bgcolor="ffbbbb"
| 45 || May 24 || @ Reds || 4 – 3 (11) || Fisher (1–0) || Vizcaíno (1–2) || || 27,796 || 17–28
|- align="center" bgcolor="bbffbb"
| 46 || May 25 || Rays || 11–10 || Sowers (1–2) || Isringhausen (0–1) || || 20,929 || 18–28
|- align="center" bgcolor="bbffbb"
| 47 || May 26 || Rays || 5–1 || Pavano (5–4) || Garza (4–3) || || 18,754 || 19–28
|- align="center" bgcolor="bbffbb"
| 48 || May 27 || Rays || 12–7 || Aquino (1–0) || Sonnanstine (3–5) || Vizcaíno (1) || 19,335 || 20–28
|- align="center" bgcolor="bbffbb"
| 49 || May 28 || Rays || 2–1 || Herges (1–0) || Niemann (4–4) || Wood (8) || 27,356 || 21–28
|- align="center" bgcolor="ffbbbb"
| 50 || May 29 || Yankees || 3–1 || Pettitte (5–1) || Lee (2–6) || Rivera (10) || 32,802 || 21–29
|- align="center" bgcolor="ffbbbb"
| 51 || May 30 || Yankees || 10–5 || Sabathia (5–3) || Carmona (2–5) || || 34,396 || 21–30
|- align="center" bgcolor="bbffbb"
| 52 || May 31 || Yankees || 5–4 || Wood (2–2) || Coke (1–3) || || 29, 405 || 22–30
|-

|- bgcolor="ffbbbb"
|- align="center" bgcolor="ffbbbb"
| 53 || June 1 || Yankees || 5–2 || Chamberlain (3–1) || Aquino (1–1) || Rivera (11) || 23,651 || 22–31
|- align="center" bgcolor="ffbbbb"
| 54 || June 2 || @ Twins || 4–3 || Slowey (8–1) || Huff (0–2) || Nathan (10) || 26,530 || 22–32
|- align="center" bgcolor="bbffbb"
| 55 || June 3 || @ Twins || 10–1 || Lee (3–6) || Swarzak (1–2) || || 29,336 || 23–32
|- align="center" bgcolor="ffbbbb"
| 56 || June 4 || @ Twins || 11–3 || Baker (3–6) || Carmona (2–6) || || 20,897 || 23–33
|- align="center" bgcolor="bbffbb"
| 57 || June 5 || @ White Sox || 6–0 || Pavano (6–4) || Danks (4–4) || || 29,825 || 24–33
|- align="center" bgcolor="ffbbbb"
| 58 || June 6 || @ White Sox || 4–2 || Floyd (4–5) || Sowers (1–3) || Jenks (13) || 30,307 || 24–34
|- align="center" bgcolor="bbffbb"
| 59 || June 7 || @ White Sox || 8–4 || Huff (1–2) || Colón (3–6) || || 25,609 || 25–34
|- align="center" bgcolor="bbffbb"
| 60 || June 9 || Royals || 8–4 || Pérez (1–1) || Cruz (3–2) || || 15,038 || 26–34
|- align="center" bgcolor="ffbbbb"
| 61 || June 10 || Royals || 9–0 || Meche (3–5) || Pavano (6–5) || || 16,257 || 26–35
|- align="center" bgcolor="bbffbb"
| 62 || June 11 || Royals || 4 – 3 (10) || Herges (2–0) || Farnsworth (1–4) || || 14,342 || 27–35
|- align="center" bgcolor="bbffbb"
| 63 || June 12 || Cardinals || 7–3 || Huff (2–2) || Piñeiro (5–7) || || 28,159 || 28–35
|- align="center" bgcolor="ffbbbb"
| 64 || June 13 || Cardinals || 3–1 || Thompson (1–2) || Ohka (0–1) || Franklin (15) || 31,754 || 28–36
|- align="center" bgcolor="bbffbb"
| 65 || June 14 || Cardinals || 3–0 || Lee (4–6) || Carpenter (4–1) || || 23,644 || 29–36
|- align="center" bgcolor="ffbbbb"
| 66 || June 15 || Brewers || 14–12 || Coffey (2–1) || Pérez (1–2) || Hoffman (16) || 25,415 || 29–37
|- align="center" bgcolor="ffbbbb"
| 67 || June 16 || Brewers || 7–5 || Gallardo (7–3) || Sowers (1–4) || || 22,986 || 29–38
|- align="center" bgcolor="ffbbbb"
| 68 || June 17 || Brewers || 9 – 8 (11) || DiFelice (4–0) || Aquino (1–2) || Stetter (1) || 15,269 || 29–39
|- align="center" bgcolor="ffbbbb"
| 69 || June 19 || @ Cubs || 8 – 7 (10) || Gregg (2–1) || Vizcaíno (1–3) || || 40,155 || 29–40
|- align="center" bgcolor="ffbbbb"
| 70 || June 20 || @ Cubs || 6 – 5 (13) || Patton (3–1) || Wood (2–3) || || 41,007 || 29–41
|- align="center" bgcolor="ffbbbb"
| 71 || June 21 || @ Cubs || 6–2 || Wells (1–3) || Sowers (1–5) || Gregg (11) || 40,866 || 29–42
|- align="center" bgcolor="bbffbb"
| 72 || June 23 || @ Pirates || 5–4 || Huff (3–2) || Snell (2–8) || Wood (9) || 19,109 || 30–42
|- align="center" bgcolor="ffbbbb"
| 73 || June 24 || @ Pirates || 10–6 || Duke (8–5) || Pavano (6–6) || || 20,162 || 30–43
|- align="center" bgcolor="ffbbbb"
| 74 || June 25 || @ Pirates || 3–2 || Capps (1–3) || Herges (2–1) || || 30,120 || 30–44
|- align="center" bgcolor="bbffbb"
| 75 || June 26 || Reds || 9–2 || Sowers (2–5) || Harang (5–8) || || 28,114 || 31–44
|- align="center" bgcolor="ffbbbb"
| 76 || June 27 || Reds || 7–3 || Bailey (1–0) || Ohka (0–2) || || 28,646 || 31–45
|- align="center" bgcolor="ffbbbb"
| 77 || June 28 || Reds || 8–1 || Owings (5–8) || Huff (3–3) || || 23,900 || 31–46
|- align="center" bgcolor="ffbbbb"
| 78 || June 29 || White Sox || 6–3 || Floyd (6–5) || Pavano (6–7) || || 15,645 || 31–47
|- align="center" bgcolor="ffbbbb"
| 79 || June 30 || White Sox || 11 – 4 (7) || Richard (3–1) || Lee (4–7) || || 14,793 || 31–48
|-

|- bgcolor="ffbbbb"
|- align="center" bgcolor="ffbbbb"
| 80 || July 1 || White Sox || 6–2 || Contreras (3–7) || Sowers (2–6) || || 16,722 || 31–49
|- align="center" bgcolor="bbffbb"
| 81 || July 3 || Athletics || 15–3 || Huff (4–3) || Cahill (5–7) || || 26,557 || 32–49
|- align="center" bgcolor="bbffbb"
| 82 || July 4 || Athletics || 5–2 || Pavano (7–7) || Mazzaro (2–4) || Wood (10) || 24,501 || 33–49
|- align="center" bgcolor="ffbbbb"
| 83 || July 5 || Athletics || 5–2 || Gonzalez (1–2) || Lee (4–7) || Bailey (9) || 19,105 || 33–50
|- align="center" bgcolor="ffbbbb"
| 84 || July 7 || @ White Sox || 10–6 || Buehrle (9–2) || Sowers (2–7) || || 23,758 || 33–51
|- align="center" bgcolor="ffbbbb"
| 85 || July 8 || @ White Sox || 5–1 || Contreras (4–7) || Laffey (3–2) || || 26,772 || 33–52
|- align="center" bgcolor="bbffbb"
| 86 || July 9 || @ White Sox || 10–8 || Sipp (1–0) || Richard (3–3) || Wood (11) || 27,257 || 34–52
|- align="center" bgcolor="ffbbbb"
| 87 || July 10 || @ Tigers || 5–1 || Jackson (7–4) || Lee (4–9) || || 35,592 || 34–53
|- align="center" bgcolor="bbffbb"
| 88 || July 11 || @ Tigers || 5–4 || Pavano (8–7) || Galarraga (5–8) || Wood (12) || 41,782 || 35–53
|- align="center" bgcolor="ffbbbb"
| 89 || July 12 || @ Tigers || 10–1 || Verlander (10–4) || Ohka (0–3) || || 39,680 || 35–54
|- align="center" bgcolor="bbffbb"
| 90 || July 16 || Mariners || 4–1 || Lee (5–9) || Olson (3–3) || || 22,371 || 36–54
|- align="center" bgcolor="ffbbbb"
| 91 || July 17 || Mariners || 6–2 || Hernández (10–3) || Huff (4–4) || || 23,545 || 36–55
|- align="center" bgcolor="ffbbbb"
| 92 || July 18 || Mariners || 3–1 || Washburn (7–6) || Ohka (0–4) || Aardsma (21) || 24,893 || 36–56
|- align="center" bgcolor="ffbbbb"
| 93 || July 19 || Mariners || 5–3 || Kelley (2–1) || Betancourt (1–2) || Aardsma (22)|| 20,900 || 36–57
|- align="center" bgcolor="bbffbb"
| 94 || July 21 || @ Blue Jays || 2–1 || Lee (6–9) || Downs (1–1) || || 18,330 || 37–57
|- align="center" bgcolor="ffbbbb"
| 95 || July 22 || @ Blue Jays || 10–6 || Romero (8–4) || Pavano (8–8) || || 18,375 || 37–58
|- align="center" bgcolor="bbffbb"
| 96 || July 23 || @ Blue Jays || 5–4 || Huff (5–4) || Rzepczynski (1–2) || Wood (13) || 32,061 || 38–58
|- align="center" bgcolor="bbffbb"
| 97 || July 24 || @ Mariners || 9–0 || Laffey (4–2) || Rowland-Smith (0–1) || || 34,802 || 39–58
|- align="center" bgcolor="bbffbb"
| 98 || July 25 || @ Mariners || 10–3 || Sowers (3–7) || Bédard (5–3) || || 29,213 || 40–58
|- align="center" bgcolor="bbffbb"
| 99 || July 26 || @ Mariners || 12–3 || Lee (7–9) || Vargas (3–4) || || 30,224 || 41–58
|- align="center" bgcolor="bbffbb"
| 100 || July 27 || @ Angels || 8–6 || Veras (4–1) || Fuentes (1–3) || Wood (14) || 35,371 || 42–58
|- align="center" bgcolor="ffbbbb"
| 101 || July 28 || @ Angels || 7–6 || Palmer (9–1) || Huff (5–5) || Bulger (1) || 43,270 || 42–59
|- align="center" bgcolor="ffbbbb"
| 102 || July 29 || @ Angels || 9–3 || Lackey (7–4) || Laffey (4–3) || || 39,196 || 42–60
|- align="center" bgcolor="bbffbb"
| 103 || July 31 || Tigers || 6–5 || Ohka (1–4) || Fien (0–1) || || 35,273 || 43–60
|-

|- bgcolor="ffbbbb"
|- align="center" bgcolor="ffbbbb"
| 104 || August 1 || Tigers || 4 – 3 (12) || Seay (2–2) || Veras (4–2) || Miner (1)|| 31.353 || 43–61
|- align="center" bgcolor="bbffbb"
| 105 || August 2 || Tigers || 11–1 || Pavano (9–8) || Galarraga (5–10) || || 24,718 || 44–61
|- align="center" bgcolor="ffbbbb"
| 106 || August 4 || Twins || 10–1 || Baker (9–7) || Huff (5–6) || || 17,518 || 44–62
|- align="center" bgcolor="bbffbb"
| 107 || August 5 || Twins || 8–1 || Laffey (5–3) || Liriano (4–11) || || 17,683 || 45–62
|- align="center" bgcolor="bbffbb"
| 108 || August 6 || Twins || 2–1 || Sipp (2–0) || Blackburn (8–6) || Wood (15) || 21,657 || 46–62
|- align="center" bgcolor="bbffbb"
| 109 || August 7 || @ White Sox || 6–2 || Sowers (4–7) || Buehrle (11–6) || || 27,153 || 47–62
|- align="center" bgcolor="ffbbbb"
| 110 || August 8 || @ White Sox || 8–5 || Carrasco (4–2) || Todd (0–1) || || 35,224 || 47–63
|- align="center" bgcolor="bbffbb"
| 111 || August 9 || @ White Sox || 8–4 || Huff (6–6) || Contreras (4–11) || || 34,063 || 48–63
|- align="center" bgcolor="bbffbb"
| 112 || August 11 || Rangers || 5–0 || Laffey (6–3) || Nippert (3–1) || || 21,870 || 49–63
|- align="center" bgcolor="ffbbbb"
| 113 || August 12 || Rangers || 5–0 || Hunter (5–2) || Carmona (2–7) || || 18,794 || 49–64
|- align="center" bgcolor="ffbbbb"
| 114 || August 13 || Rangers || 4–1 || Feldman (12–4) || Sowers (4–8) || Francisco (16) || 20,090 || 49–65
|- align="center" bgcolor="ffbbbb"
| 115 || August 14 || @ Twins || 11–0 || Baker (10–7) || Masterson (3–4) || || 34,845 || 49–66
|- align="center" bgcolor="bbffbb"
| 116 || August 15 || @ Twins || 7–3 || Huff (7–6) || Swarzak (3–6) || || 33,931 || 50–66
|- align="center" bgcolor="bbffbb"
| 117 || August 16 || @ Twins || 7–4 || Laffey (7–3) || Blackburn (8–8) || || 30,260 || 51–66
|- align="center" bgcolor="ffbbbb"
| 118 || August 18 || Angels || 5–4 || Bell (1–0) || Carmona (2–7) || Fuentes (35) || 18,341 || 51–67
|- align="center" bgcolor="ffbbbb"
| 119 || August 19 || Angels || 3–0 || Weaver (13–4) || Sowers (4–9) || || 16,868 || 51–68
|- align="center" bgcolor="bbffbb"
| 120 || August 20 || Angels || 11–3 || Masterson (4–4) || Lackey (8–6) || || 16,804 || 52–68
|- align="center" bgcolor="ffbbbb"
| 121 || August 21 || Mariners || 9–4 || French (3–3) || Huff (7–7) || || 28,503 || 52–69
|- align="center" bgcolor="bbffbb"
| 122 || August 22 || Mariners || 4–3 || Pérez (2–2) || Messenger (0–1) || || 28,942 || 53–69
|- align="center" bgcolor="bbffbb"
| 123 || August 23 || Mariners || 6–1 || Carmona (3–7) || Hernández (12–5) || || 23,086 || 54–69
|- align="center" bgcolor="bbffbb"
| 124 || August 24 || @ Royals || 10–6 || Sowers (5–9) || Soria (3–2) || || 11,101 || 55–69
|- align="center" bgcolor="ffbbbb"
| 125 || August 25 || @ Royals || 6–2 || Greinke (12–8) || Masterson (4–5) || || 17,353 || 55–70
|- align="center" bgcolor="bbffbb"
| 126 || August 26 || @ Royals || 4–2 || Huff (8–7) || Hochevar (6–7) || Wood (16) || 10,751 || 56–70
|- align="center" bgcolor="bbffbb"
| 127 || August 27 || @ Orioles || 5–4 || Pérez (3–2) || Johnson (3–5) || Wood (17) || 13,991 || 57–70
|- align="center" bgcolor="ffbbbb"
| 128 || August 28 || @ Orioles || 13–4 || Berken (4–11) || Carmona (3–9) || || 13,961 || 57–71
|- align="center" bgcolor="bbffbb"
| 129 || August 29 || @ Orioles || 5–3 || Pérez (4–2) || Ray (0–2) || C. Perez (1) || 24,358 || 58–71
|- align="center" bgcolor="ffbbbb"
| 130 || August 30 || @ Orioles || 5–2 || Matusz (3–2) || Masterson (4–6) || Johnson (7) || 20,643 || 58–72
|-

|- bgcolor="ffbbbb"
|- align="center" bgcolor="ffbbbb"
| 131 || September 1 || @ Tigers || 8–5 || Jackson (11–6) || Carrasco (0–1) || Rodney (30) ||24,225 || 58–73
|- align="center" bgcolor="ffbbbb"
| 132 || September 2 || @ Tigers || 4–2 || Porcello (12–8) || Laffey (7–4) || Rodney (31) || 25,840 || 58–74
|- align="center" bgcolor="ffbbbb"
| 133 || September 3 || @ Tigers || 4–3 (10) || Miner (6–4) || Pérez (4–3) || || 28,267 || 58–75
|- align="center" bgcolor="bbffbb"
| 134 || September 4 || Twins || 5–2 || Sowers (6–9) || Pavano (10–11) || Wood (18) || 24,402 || 59–75
|- align="center" bgcolor="ffbbbb"
| 135 || September 5 || Twins || 4–1 || Baker (13–7) || Masterson (4–7) || Nathan (36) || 19,455 || 59–76
|- align="center" bgcolor="bbffbb"
| 136 || September 6 || Twins || 3–1 || Huff (9–7) || Blackburn (9–10) || Wood (19) || 17,911 || 60–76
|- align="center" bgcolor="bbbbbb"
| || September 7 || Rangers || colspan=6 |Postponed (rain); rescheduled for September 8
|- align="center" bgcolor="ffbbbb"
| 137 || September 8 || Rangers || 11–9 || Feliz (1–0) || Lewis (2–4) || || || 60–77
|- align="center" bgcolor="ffbbbb"
| 138 || September 8 || Rangers || 10–5 || McCarthy (7–2) || Laffey (7–5) || || 12,976 || 60–78
|- align="center" bgcolor="ffbbbb"
| 139 || September 9 || Rangers || 10–0 || Feldman (16–4) || Carmona (3–10) || || 14,637 || 60–79
|- align="center" bgcolor="ffbbbb"
| 140 || September 11 || Royals || 2–1 || Wright (2–5) || Veras (4–3) || Soria (25) || 26,006 || 60–80
|- align="center" bgcolor="bbffbb"
| 141 || September 12 || Royals || 13–6 || Huff (10–7) || Hochevar (6–10) || || 24,842 || 61–80
|- align="center" bgcolor="ffbbbb"
| 142 || September 13 || Royals || 7–0 || Davies (8–9) || Carrasco (0–2) || || 21,153 || 61–81
|- align="center" bgcolor="ffbbbb"
| 143 || September 14 || @ Twins || 6–3 || Mahay (2–1) || C. Perez (0–1) || Nathan (39) || 20,640 || 61–82
|- align="center" bgcolor="ffbbbb"
| 144 || September 15 || @ Twins || 5–4 || Rauch (3–1) || Carmona (3–11) || Nathan (40) || 19,035 || 61–83
|- align="center" bgcolor="ffbbbb"
| 145 || September 16 || @ Twins || 7–3 || Blackburn (10–11) || Laffey (7–6) || Nathan (41) || 16,921 || 61–84
|- align="center" bgcolor="ffbbbb"
| 146 || September 17 || @ Athletics || 5–2 || Mortensen (2–2) || Masterson (4–8) || Bailey (25) || 10,873 || 61–85
|- align="center" bgcolor="ffbbbb"
| 147 || September 18 || @ Athletics || 2–1 || Anderson (10–10) || Huff (10–8) || Ziegler (7) || 22,893 || 61–86
|- align="center" bgcolor="ffbbbb"
| 148 || September 19 || @ Athletics || 8–4 || Kilby (1–0) || Sowers (6–10) || Wuertz (4) || 17,209 || 61–86
|- align="center" bgcolor="ffbbbb"
| 149 || September 20 || @ Athletics || 11–4 || Eveland (2–3) || Carmona (3–12) || || 15,430 || 61–87
|- align="center" bgcolor="ffbbbb"
| 150 || September 22 || Tigers || 3–1 || Jackson (13–7) || Laffey (7–7) || Rodney (34) || 23,217|| 61–88
|- align="center" bgcolor="ffbbbb"
| 151 || September 23 || Tigers || 11–3 || Porcello (14–9) || Masterson (4–9) || ||13,971 || 61–89
|- align="center" bgcolor="ffbbbb"
| 152 || September 24 || Tigers || 6–5 || Verlander (17–9) || Carrasco (0–3) || Rodney (35) ||23,516 || 61–90
|- align="center" bgcolor="bbffbb"
| 153 || September 25 || Orioles || 4–2 || Carmona (4–12) || Hernandez (4–9) || Wood (20) || 33,472 || 62–90
|- align="center" bgcolor="bbffbb"
| 154 || September 26 || Orioles || 9–8 || Wood (3–3) || Johnson (4–6) || || 31,749 || 63–90
|- align="center" bgcolor="bbffbb"
| 155 || September 27 || Orioles || 9–0 || Huff (11–8) || Tillman (2–5) || || 29,930 || 64–90
|- align="center" bgcolor="ffbbbb"
| 156 || September 28 || White Sox || 6–1 || Danks (13–10) || Laffey (7–8) || || 23,088 || 64–91
|- align="center" bgcolor="bbbbbb"
| || September 29 || White Sox || colspan=6 | Postponed (rain) Rescheduled for September 30
|- align="center" bgcolor="bbffbb"
| 157 || September 30 || White Sox || 5–1 || Carmona (5–12) || Torres (1–2) || || || 65–92
|- align="center" bgcolor="ffbbbb"
| 158 || September 30 || White Sox || 1–0 || Buehrle (13–10) || Masterson (4–10) || Thornton (4) || 16,871 || 65–93
|- align="center" bgcolor="ffbbbb"
| 159 || October 1 || @ Red Sox || 3–0 || Lester (15–8) || Carrasco (0–4) || Papelbon (38) || 37,459 || 65–94
|- align="center" bgcolor="ffbbbb"
| 160 || October 2 || @ Red Sox || 6–2 || Matsuzaka (4–6) || Sowers (6–11) || || 37,787 || 65–95
|- align="center" bgcolor="ffbbbb"
| 161 || October 3 || @ Red Sox || 11–6 || Beckett (17–6) || Laffey (7–9) || || 37,562 || 65–96
|- align="center" bgcolor="ffbbbb"
| 162 || October 4 || @ Red Sox || 12–7 || Bowden (1–1) || Ohka (1–5) || || 37,247 || 65–97
|-

Player stats

Batting 
Note: G = Games played; AB = At bats; R = Runs scored; H = Hits; 2B = Doubles; 3B = Triples; HR = Home runs; RBI = Runs batted in; AVG = Batting average; SB = Stolen bases

Pitching 
Note: W = Wins; L = Losses; ERA = Earned run average; G = Games pitched; GS = Games started; SV = Saves; IP = Innings pitched; H = Hits allowed; R = Runs allowed; ER = Earned runs allowed; BB = Walks allowed; K = Strikeouts

Minor league affiliates

External links 

 2009 Cleveland Indians Season Official Site
 2009 Cleveland Indians Season at Baseball Reference

Cleveland Indians
Cleveland Guardians seasons
Cleve